Eakin Creek Floodplain Provincial Park is a provincial park in British Columbia, Canada located on the North Thompson River near the community of Little Fort.

See also
Eakin Creek Canyon Provincial Park

References
Eakin Creek Floodplain Park

Provincial parks of British Columbia
Thompson Country
Year of establishment missing